The following is a list of mayors of Cluj-Napoca, Romania since 1919.

References

 List
History of Cluj-Napoca
Cluj-Napoca